Little Bahala Creek is a stream in the U.S. state of Mississippi. It is a tributary to Big Bahala Creek.

Bahala most likely is the Choctaw language word meaning "(standing) mulberry". A variant name is "Reed River".

References

Rivers of Mississippi
Rivers of Lawrence County, Mississippi
Rivers of Lincoln County, Mississippi
Mississippi placenames of Native American origin